The Conference of the Twenty Two was an important organizational meeting in the foundation of the Bolshevik faction of the Russian Social Democratic Labour Party. Despite its name the conference was only attended by 19 people, the remaining three adding their names to the text subsequently.

The conference adopted Vladimir Lenin's text To the Party.

Attendees

The conference was held near Geneva between 30 July and 1 August 1904. It was attended by:

 Vladimir Lenin
 Alexander Bogdanov
 Vladimir Bonch-Bruevich
 
 Sergey Ivanovich Gusev
 Pyotr Krasikov

See also
Letter of the Twenty Two, 1922

References

Bolsheviks
1904 in Switzerland